Shentan Town(), is an urban town in Liling City, Zhuzhou City, Hunan Province, People's Republic of China.

Cityscape
The town is divided into 12 villages and 3 communities, the following areas:Pingli Community, Xinghu Community, Mapoli Community, Meitian Village, Jingxian Village, Aoxian Village, Zhashi Village, Sanxingli Village, Shentan Village, Panglong Village, Xintian Village, Jiangkou Village, Shuanglong Village, Xintang Village, and Xiaxing Village.

References

External links

Divisions of Liling